The seventh and final season of Parks and Recreation aired in the United States on the NBC television network from January 13, 2015 until February 24, 2015. The season consisted of 13 episodes. It stars Amy Poehler, Aziz Ansari, Nick Offerman, Aubrey Plaza, Chris Pratt, Adam Scott, Jim O'Heir, and Retta, with a supporting performance from Billy Eichner.

This season differs from any other season of Parks and Recreation, in that it details a much larger story arc for the characters, showcasing their growth over the course of the show. Set in 2017, three years after the events of Season 6, the season includes Leslie Knope's (Amy Poehler) new career as Regional Director of the National Park Service, in addition to her two-year-long fallout with former boss Ron Swanson (Nick Offerman). Also included is the rise of fictional tech company Gryzzl taking over Pawnee, Leslie's plea to Sweetums for a Pawnee National Park, and the eventual career departures of the gang from the Parks department.

Cast

Main
 Amy Poehler as Leslie Knope, a passionate government employee who loves her home town. She has not let politics dampen her optimism; her ultimate goal is to become President of the United States. Poehler departed from the NBC sketch comedy series Saturday Night Live, where she was a cast member for nearly seven years, to star in Parks and Recreation. It was only after she was cast that Daniels and Schur established the general concept of the show and the script for the pilot was written.
 Aziz Ansari as Tom Haverford, Leslie's former sarcastic and underachieving subordinate, who has left his city hall job to pursue his own entrepreneurial interests. Daniels and Schur had intended to cast Ansari from the earliest stages of the development of Parks and Recreation.
 Nick Offerman as Ron Swanson, the former parks and recreation director who, as a libertarian, believes in as small a government as possible. As such, Ron strives to make his department as ineffective as possible, and favors hiring employees who do not care about their jobs or are poor at them. Nevertheless, Ron consistently demonstrates that he secretly cares deeply about his fellow co-workers.
 Aubrey Plaza as April Ludgate-Dwyer, a cynical and uninterested former parks department intern who now works for Leslie at the National Parks Department. The role was written specifically for Plaza; after meeting her, casting director Allison Jones told Schur, "I just met the weirdest girl I've ever met in my life. You have to meet her and put her on your show."
 Chris Pratt as Andy Dwyer, a goofy, dim-witted but lovable slacker. Pratt was originally intended to be a guest star and the character Andy was initially meant to appear only in the first season, but the producers liked Pratt so much that, almost immediately after casting him, they decided to make him a regular cast member starting with season two.
 Adam Scott as Ben Wyatt, a brilliant but socially awkward government official trying to redeem his past as a failed mayor in his youth. Scott left his starring role on the Starz comedy series Party Down to join the show.
 Jim O'Heir as Garry Gergich, a sweet-natured but painfully incompetent longtime city employee who is the main target of the office's petty unkindness, yet enjoys his life as the husband of a gorgeous woman and the father of three beautiful daughters. He reached retirement with a full pension in season 5, but returned to the Parks office to work as an intern. As of season six, the other characters have taken to calling him "Larry Gengurch," after he accidentally called himself that name.  In a flashforward at the end of the season 6 finale, he is now called Terry.  By the end of the season 7 episode "Donna & Joe", his friends finally call him by his real name Garry, thanks to Donna.
 Retta as Donna Meagle, the confident and competent former office manager for the Pawnee Parks and Recreation Department. She is now accepting of her former coworkers, previously dismissing them as boring. She currently works as a real estate agent. She has little tolerance for stupidity, can sometimes be selfish, enjoys casual dating, and is irresistible to many men. Donna loves her car, a Mercedes-Benz M-Class SUV.

Starring
 Billy Eichner as Craig Middlebrooks, the hot-tempered director of the Pawnee parks department. After appearing in numerous episodes throughout the sixth season, Eichner was promoted from a recurring role to a starring role in the cast, beginning with "Leslie & Ron," the fourth episode of season seven.

Recurring
 Natalie Morales as Lucy, Tom's ex-girlfriend and bartender at The Snakehole Lounge. She is later hired to manage Tom's Bistro.
 Megan Mullally as Tammy Swanson (also known as "Tammy Two"), a librarian and Ron's sex-crazed ex-wife.
 Ben Schwartz as Jean-Ralphio, Tom's best friend and frequent business associate.
 Mo Collins as Joan Callamezzo, a Pawnee talk show host known for her ludicrous behavior and time on the show Pawnee Today.
 Jay Jackson as Perd Hapley, a popular Pawnee television journalist and the host of news programs Ya Heard? With Perd! and The Final Word with Perd!.
 Jon Glaser as Jeremy Jamm, a Pawnee councilman and Leslie's long time arch-rival.
 Susan Yeagley as Jessica Newport, former Miss Pawnee 1994 & CEO of the Sweetums Corporation.
 Jenny Slate as Mona-Lisa Saperstein, Tom's crazy ex-girlfriend and Jean-Ralphio's sister.
 Marc Evan Jackson as Trevor Nelsson, a lawyer who provides legal assistance for the Newport Family.
 Jonathan Joss as Ken Hotate, leader of the Wamapoke people and owner of the Wamapoke casino in Pawnee.
 Blake Anderson as Mike Bean, CEO of tech-company "Gryzzl".
 Jorma Taccone as Roscoe Santangelo, Vice-president of Cool New Shiz at tech-company "Gryzzl".
 Kathryn Hahn as Jennifer Barkley, a blunt, supercharged political consultant who was Bobby Newport's campaign manager when he was running against Leslie.
 Henry Winkler as Dr. Saperstein, a local gynecologist and the wealthy father of Jean-Ralphio and Mona Lisa.
 Helen Slayton-Hughes as Ethel Beavers, an elderly Pawnee government worker who publicly reveals her 46-year affair with Mayor Gunderson.
 Keegan-Michael Key as Joe, a school principal and Donna's husband.

Guest stars
 Rashida Jones as Ann Perkins, a nurse who gradually becomes more involved in Pawnee government through her friendship with Leslie. She is also Chris' girlfriend and mother to Oliver and Leslie.
 Rob Lowe as Chris Traeger, an excessively positive and extremely health-conscious government official. He is also Ann's boyfriend and father to their children Oliver and Leslie.
 Werner Herzog as Keg Jeggings, the owner of a creepy house April and Andy purchase.
 Dax Shepard as Hank Muntak, station manager at Pawnee Community Access, the public television network that broadcasts the "Johnny Karate" television show
 Peter Serafinowicz as Lord Edgar Covington, Andy's former employer
 Sam Elliott as Ron Dunn, the former head of the Eagleton parks department.
 Josh Groban as himself
 Questlove as Levondrious Meagle, Donna's estranged younger brother.
 Ginuwine as a fictionalized version of himself as Donna's cousin.
 Barbara Boxer as herself
 Kirsten Gillibrand as herself
 John McCain as himself
 Cory Booker as himself
 Orrin Hatch as himself
 Madeleine Albright as herself
 John Cena as himself, one of the guests on the final episode of Andy's show.
 Paul Rudd as Bobby Newport, a dimwitted multimillionaire heir of the Sweetums Candy Company fortune, and former candidate for city council running against Leslie.
 Bill Murray as Walter Gunderson, mayor of Pawnee
 Jon Hamm as Ed, a former incompetent employee of the National Park Service.
 Kevin Symons as Bill Dexhart, a Pawnee councilman who is a self described pervert.
 Yvans Jourdain as Councilman Douglass Howser, a Pawnee councilman who is the leader of the council.
 Joe Biden as himself
 Jill Biden as herself

Episodes

 denotes an extended episode.
 denotes an hour-long episode.

Production
All 13 episodes were aired in seven weeks by airing two each week, back-to-back (with the exception of one week). Production began on August 11, 2014, and ended on December 12, 2014. Although the program initially premiered in NBC's Must See TV Thursday night block, the final episodes were moved to Tuesdays, possibly in an attempt to compete with ABC's dramas.

Reception
The seventh season of Parks and Recreation largely received positive praise from critics. Rotten Tomatoes gave the season an 89% rating based on 27 critic reviews. The critical consensus reads: "Parks and Recreations closing chapter deftly incorporates time-skip gags into the everyday bureaucracy of Pawnee, all while delivering a moving farewell to a cast of characters audiences have grown to love like family." 

IGN reviewer Matt Fowler gave the series finale a perfect 10 out of 10 score, saying "Doing what the show does best, Parks knocked it clear out of the park with "One Last Ride." A remarkably irresistible swirl of love and satire. The writers knew it wasn't enough to just send everyone off into the future. They knew we needed to see that future. Not just for peace of mind, but because we've all become so lovingly invested in the characters. This final season proved to us that we could withstand a time jump and still remain attached to everyone. And this finale used that to hop through the Pawnee gang's futures, creating an exciting, heartwarming journey."

The New Yorkers Emily Nussbaum contended that the series finale invoked "few laughs", and Screen Rants Nathanial Eker-Male called the season "jarring and distracting". The Guardian critic Diane Shipley claimed that the season "jumped the shark".

Accolades 
The seventh season of Parks and Recreation was nominated for the Primetime Emmy Award for Outstanding Comedy Series and Amy Poehler received her sixth Emmy nomination for Outstanding Lead Actress in a Comedy Series for her performance in the series finale, "One Last Ride".

References

External links
 at NBC.com

7
2015 American television seasons
Fiction set in 2017